Federal Highway 15D (Carretera Federal 15D) is the name for toll highways paralleling Federal Highway 15. The toll segments of Highway 15D include some of the most significant highways in the country along the Nogales-Mexico City corridor. The highway is the southern terminus of the CANAMEX Corridor, a trade corridor that stretches from Mexico north across the United States to the Canadian province of Alberta.

Two segments of Federal Highway 15D (México-La Marquesa and Guadalajara-Tepic) are among the top five most expensive toll roads in Mexico, according to a 2016 analysis by Carmatch.

Sonora

Estación Don-Nogales and bypasses

With  of length, Highway 15D's segment in Sonora, formerly known as Estación Don-Nogales, runs the length of the state of Sonora and includes access to most of the state's major population centers. It is maintained by Caminos y Puentes Federales, which charges cars 340 pesos to travel the length of the road, including its four bypasses of Nogales, Magdalena de Kino (25 pesos), Guaymas (31 pesos) and, Hermosillo.

Highway 15 is free between Nogales and Magdalena de Kino and from Hermosillo to Guaymas, but between Guaymas and Ciudad Obregón, and from Ciudad Obregón to Los Mochis, Sinaloa, cars are tolled for intercity transit, and unlike with most of the country's toll roads (which are completely bypassed by non-toll highways), there are no non-toll alternatives to Highway 15D through much of Sonora.

The road is currently being widened to four lanes throughout, a project scheduled to be completed by 2018; at the same time, several curves are being redesigned to bring the entire road up to autopista status. Additionally, bypasses are being constructed to avoid the route's two largest cities.

Libramiento de Ciudad Obregón
In 2014, a concession was awarded to GIA+A and Invex Infraestructura to build a  bypass of Ciudad Obregón, which circles around the city to the north and east. The first portion of the highway opened in October 2017. This bypass is operated by OCACSA, and cars pay 155 pesos to use it.

Libramiento de Hermosillo
In 2015, a consortium of IDINSA, Constructora MAS and PRIMEX was selected to build a bypass of Hermosillo, with an expected completion date at the end of 2017. More recent estimates place completion in mid-2018. This is now open since May 9th 2019 although portions are 2 lanes. One toll booth is open (113 pesos). A second toll booth appears to be under construction. Southbound entry ramp not complete and requires travelling westbound on Blvd Morales (Bv Gustavo Mazon Lopez) and making a U-turn.

Sinaloa: Culiacán to Mazatlán

Travelers on Highway 15 get their next opportunity to take a toll road west of Guamúchil, where Sinaloa State Highway 1D forms. Highway 1D does not take on the federal designation until west of Culiacán, at which time the Autopista Mazatlán-Culiacán, operated by IDEAL, begins. IDEAL operates the stretches that form Highway 15D between Culiacán and Guadalajara. Travelers can access the road via the Libramiento de Culiacán, which begins at Highway 1D and costs 30 pesos for cars, or by heading south on Av. Jesús Kumate within Culiacán. The two roads meet at Costa Rica, taking a southeast trajectory past La Cruz de Elota, Dimas and Mármol toward Mazatlán. Two toll plazas, Costa Rica and Mármol, charge 130 and 116 pesos, respectively, with the total cost of the road being 246 pesos.

North of Mazatlán, this highway ends, and motorists can enter the city or continue along the Libramiento de Mazatlán, also operated by IDEAL. East of Villa Unión, Highway 15D serves as the western terminus of Mexican Federal Highway 40D to Durango.

Mazatlán, Sinaloa to Tepic, Nayarit

Exiting the Mazatlán area and Villa Unión, Highway 15D heads for Tepic, Nayarit, passing El Rosario and Escuinapa before entering Nayarit west of Acaponeta. Cars pay a toll of 480 pesos to travel between Mazatlán and Tepic.

The Mazatlán-Tepic highway was constructed in multiple phases, all but one completed prior to the current concession and two built by the Secretariat of Communications and Transportation.

Tepic, Nayarit to Guadalajara, Jalisco

Highway 15D continues its trajectory toward Tepic. It has interchanges at Nayarit State Highway 68 to Acaponeta and Tecuala before entering the Tepic area. Entering Tepic from the northwest, travelers have the option to enter the city and merge with Highway 15 or to take the Libramiento de Tepic; they also can access the new toll road to San Blas. The Libramiento de Tepic was formally inaugurated by President Enrique Peña Nieto in February 2017 and costs cars 55 pesos to travel.

At the southeast edge of Tepic, the road intersects an access to Tepic, with provision for a future connection to the south. Highway 15D proceeds past Ixtlán del Río east toward Jalisco, ending at non-toll Highway 15 west of Guadalajara. This stretch costs cars 383 pesos.

Zapotlanejo, Jalisco to Maravatío, Michoacán

The Highway 15D designation returns east of Guadalajara, with a new toll road operator, Red de Carreteras de Occidente, a consortium of Empresas ICA and Goldman Sachs which was awarded a package of various operating highways in 2007. The RCO stretch begins at Mexican Federal Highway 90D near Zapotlanejo, intersecting the Macrolibramiento Sur De Guadalajara. Heading east, Highway 15D provides access to Ocotlán and La Barca before crossing into Michoacán. In Michoacán, Highway 15D provides access to Ecuandureo, Churintzio, Panindícuaro and Huaniqueo. Skirting the southern shore of Cuitzeo Lake, Highway 15D encounters three major interchanges leading to Michoacán's major cities. Mexican Federal Highway 14D begins at Copándaro and leads to Pátzcuaro, Uruapan and Lázaro Cárdenas; Mexican Federal Highway 43D leads south to Morelia and north to Salamanca, Guanajuato; and Highway 48D serves as a toll road connecting Morelia and Highway 15D with access to the Morelia International Airport. Heading east, it meets Mexican Federal Highway 120 at Zinapécuaro before the RCO segment ends at Maravatío.

The Zapotlanejo-Maravatío highway was Mexico's most expensive toll road in 2013. It currently costs cars 566 pesos to travel from Zapotlanejo to Maravatío, divided among four major toll zones.

Maravatío, Michoacán to Atlacomulco, State of Mexico and future extension to Atizapán

To continue to Mexico City, traffic must take Highway 55D south to Toluca. The Atlacomulco interchange includes a provision for an eastern extension, which will connect Atlacomulco to Atizapán in the Mexico City metropolitan area. The concession for this  segment, which would connect it to the Autopista Chamapa-Lechería, was awarded to OHL in 2014; it was originally slated to open in April 2016, but has faced delays due to issues acquiring right of way and resultant environmental delays. It is currently scheduled to open in the first half of 2018.

Toluca to Mexico City

One last stretch of Highway 15D finishes the connection to Mexico City, connecting Toluca/Lerma to Mexico City via La Marquesa and closely paralleling non-toll Highway 15 with access to the Autopista Chamapa-La Venta, as well as to the Santa Fe area of Mexico City, before merging with Paseo de la Reforma. Both segments are operated by PINFRA.

The Mexico City-La Marquesa toll road was the third-most expensive per kilometer in 2016, with drivers paying 74 pesos to access the  highway (3.36 pesos per kilometer). The La Marquesa-Toluca segment, inaugurated by President Peña Nieto in July 2016, is even more expensive; it costs drivers 50 pesos to travel , or 3.76 pesos per kilometer.

References

External links
Autopista Mazatlán-Culiacán
Autopista Tepic-Mazatlán
Autopista Guadalajara-Tepic
Red Vía Corta (RCO): Autopista Maravatío – Zapotlanejo
Autopista Atlacomulco-Maravatío

Mexican Federal Highways